UFC 191: Johnson vs. Dodson 2 was a mixed martial arts event held on September 5, 2015, at the MGM Grand Garden Arena in Las Vegas, Nevada.

Background
Initially, a UFC Light Heavyweight Championship bout between current champion Daniel Cormier and top contender Alexander Gustafsson was linked as a possible event headliner. Although never officially announced by the UFC, the bout between Cormier and Gustafsson would not take place at this event and would instead be postponed and moved to UFC 192.

During the live Fox Sports 1 broadcast of UFC Fight Night: Mir vs. Duffee, it was confirmed that a UFC Flyweight Championship bout between current champion Demetrious Johnson and top contender John Dodson would headline the event. Their first fight at UFC on Fox: Johnson vs. Dodson ended in a unanimous decision victory for Johnson.

The co-main event featured a heavyweight bout between former UFC Heavyweight champions Andrei Arlovski and Frank Mir.

Anthony Johnson was originally expected to face Jan Błachowicz on the card. However, Johnson was pulled from the bout on July 30 in favor of a fight with Jimi Manuwa at the event. In turn, Błachowicz faced The Ultimate Fighter 19 light heavyweight winner Corey Anderson.

Raquel Pennington was initially expected to face Leslie Smith at UFC 192. However, Smith was forced to pull out of the event due to injury. Subsequently, Pennington was pulled from the card entirely in favor of a bout with former title challenger Liz Carmouche at this event. In turn, Carmouche pulled out of the fight just days after being added, citing injury and was replaced by Jéssica Andrade. This fight was a rematch, as Andrade beat Pennington via split decision at UFC 171.

Andre Fili was expected to face Clay Collard at the event. However, less than one week after the bout was announced, Fili was forced out of the bout with an injury and was replaced by Tiago Trator.

Results

Reported payout
The following is the reported payout to the fighters as reported to the Nevada State Athletic Commission. It does not include sponsor money and also does not include the UFC's traditional "fight night" bonuses.
 Demetrious Johnson: $191,000 (includes $58,000 win bonus) def. John Dodson: $60,000
 Andrei Arlovski: $225,000 (no win bonus) def. Frank Mir: $200,000
 Anthony Johnson: $230,000 (includes $115,000 win bonus) def. Jimi Manuwa: $24,000
 Corey Anderson: $30,000 (includes $15,000 win bonus) def. Jan Błachowicz: $34,000
 Paige VanZant: $24,000 (includes $12,000 win bonus) def. Alex Chambers: $12,000
 Ross Pearson: $90,000 (includes $45,000 win bonus) def. Paul Felder: $18,000
 John Lineker: $48,000 (includes $24,000 win bonus) def. Francisco Rivera: $23,000
 Raquel Pennington: $20,000 (includes $10,000 win bonus) def. Jéssica Andrade: $20,000
 Tiago Trator: $20,000 (includes $10,000 win bonus) def. Clay Collard: $10,000
 Joe Riggs: $32,000 (includes $16,000 win bonus) def. Ronald Stallings: $12,000
 Joaquim Silva: $20,000 (includes $10,000 win bonus) def. Nazareno Malegarie: $10,000

Bonus awards
The following fighters were awarded $50,000 bonuses:
Fight of the Night: John Lineker vs. Francisco Rivera
Performance of the Night: Anthony Johnson and Raquel Pennington

See also
List of UFC events
2015 in UFC

References

Ultimate Fighting Championship events
2015 in mixed martial arts
2015 in American sports
2015 in sports in Nevada
Mixed martial arts in Las Vegas
MGM Grand Garden Arena
September 2015 sports events in the United States